Arctia intercalaris is a moth of the family Erebidae. It was described by Eduard Friedrich Eversmann in 1843. It is found in Dzhungarian Alatau, Zailiiskii Alatau, Tien Shan, Alai-Pamirs, Uzbekistan, Kyrgyzstan, Tajikistan, the mountains of Afghanistan, north-western Pakistan and from Kashmir to Kulu.

Subspecies
Arctia intercalaris intercalaris (mountains of eastern Kazakhstan, Tien Shan)
Arctia intercalaris alpherakyi Staudinger, 1886 (Alai-Pamirs, Badakhsban)
Arctia intercalaris aurantiaca Seitz, 1910 (north-western Himalayas)
Arctia intercalaris elisabethana Bender & Naumann, 1980
Arctia intercalaris suttadra Moore, 1879 (Kashmir)
Arctia intercalaris thibetica Felder, 1874 (Tibet)
Arctia intercalaris truncata Kotzsch, 1938

References

Moths described in 1843
Arctiina
Moths of Asia
Taxa named by Eduard Friedrich Eversmann